Cystiscus montrouzieri is a species of very small sea snail, a marine gastropod mollusk or micromollusk in the family Cystiscidae.

Description
The size of the shell attains 1.55 mm.

Distribution
This marine shell occurs off New Caledonia.

References

Gastropods described in 1922
Montrouzieri